Oedignatha major is a species of spider of the genus Oedignatha endemic to Sri Lanka.

See also
 List of Liocranidae species

References

Liocranidae
Spiders described in 1896
Spiders of Asia
Endemic fauna of Sri Lanka